WNZN (89.1 FM) – branded Power 89.1 WNZN – is a non-commercial urban gospel radio station licensed to Lorain, Ohio, serving Lorain County, Erie County and Huron County. The WNZN studios are located off of Kansas Avenue in the city's eastern side, while the station's transmitter site currently sits in Berlin Heights.

Prior to October 2014, WNZN broadcast during limited hours on weekdays, and featured a Spanish/variety format. The station was in the process of being sold to the Pace Foundation and on November 1, 2014, WNZN changed to an Urban Gospel format branded as Power 89.1. The sale to Pace Foundation, at a price of $280,000, was consummated on November 26, 2014.

Beginning in the 2020-2021 season, WNZN is the Spanish language outlet for the Cleveland Cavaliers of the National Basketball Association (NBA).

References

External links

NZN
Radio stations established in 1990
NZN
Lorain, Ohio